Carbacanthographis novoguineensis is a species of corticolous (bark-dwelling) lichen in the family Graphidaceae. Found in Papua New Guinea, it was formally described as a new species in 2022 by Shirley Cunha Feuerstein and Robert Lücking. It is only known to occur at the type locality.

The lichen has a greenish to brownish grey thallus lacking both a cortex and a prothallus. It has hyaline ascospores that measure 15–20 by 8–10 μm; these spores have 5 transverse septa and 0 or 1 longitudinal septum. The specific epithet novoguineensis refers to the country from which it was first documented. Carbacanthographis novoguineensis contains salazinic acid, a lichen product that can be detected using thin-layer chromatography.

References

novoguineensis
Lichen species
Lichens described in 2022
Taxa named by Robert Lücking
Lichens of New Guinea